The 2013–14 season was Olimpija's fifth season in the PrvaLiga and ninth season after the dissolution of the old NK Olimpija. Olimpija participated in the PrvaLiga, Slovenian Cup, Slovenian Supercup and the Europa League.

Transfers

In:

Out:

 

 (Contract terminated in 2014)
 (Loaned out in 2013)
 (Contract terminated in 2014)

Competitions

Overall

Supercup

League

Standings

Results summary and by round

Matches

Notes

Cup

Round of 16

Quarter-finals

Semi-finals

Europa League

Second qualifying round

Season friendlies

See also
2013 Slovenian Supercup
2013–14 Slovenian PrvaLiga
2013–14 Slovenian Cup
2013–14 UEFA Europa League

NK Olimpija Ljubljana (2005) seasons
Olimpija
Olimpija